The 2019 Svenska Cupen Final was played on 30 May 2019 between BK Häcken and AFC Eskilstuna at Bravida Arena, Gothenburg, the home pitch for BK Häcken. The final is the culmination of the 2018–19 Svenska Cupen, the 63rd season of the Svenska Cupen.

BK Häcken appeared in its 3rd Svenska Cupen final, having won the title once before in 2015-16. AFC Eskilstuna made its first ever appearance in the Svenska Cupen final. The winner of the final earned themselves a place in the second qualifying round of the 2019–20 UEFA Europa League.

BK Häcken won the final convincingly, earning its second Svenska Cup title.

Teams

Venue
Since 2014–15, Svenska Cupen finals have been held in the home ground of the higher-seeded team of the tournament in an effort to bolster attendance and fan support. Bravida Arena, home pitch of BK Häcken, hosted its first Svenska Cupen final since its opening in June 2015.

Background
Häcken competed in its third-ever final, having won its only previous title in 2015–16, beating Malmö FF in a penalty shootout. Eskilstuna made its first-ever appearance in a Svenska Cupen final in just its third season as a club in its current iteration. Formerly, the club competed as FC Väsby United (2005–12) and AFC United (2013–16), and spent the 2018 season in the second-tier Superettan.

Route to the final

Note: In all results below, the score of the finalist is given first (H: home; A: away).

Match

Details
</onlyinclude>

References

Svenska Cupen Final
Svenska Cupen Final 2019
Svenska Cupen Final 2019
Svenska Cupen Finals
Svenska Cupen Final
Sports competitions in Sweden